The Swiss Life Group is the largest life insurance company of Switzerland and one of Europe’s leading comprehensive life and pensions and financial services providers, with approximately CHF 276.3 bn of assets under management. Founded in 1857 in Zurich as the Schweizerische Lebensversicherungs und Rentenanstalt cooperative, the company entered the Swiss stock market in 1997 and adopted its current name in 2002. In 2022 the group declared an adjusted profit from operations of CHF 2.06 billion, a 17% decrease compared to the previous year. Net profit increased by 16% to CHF 1.46 billion. Swiss Life is one of the twenty companies listed under the Swiss Market Index, as SLHN.

History

Foundation and growth
Conrad Widmer established the Schweizerische Rentenanstalt ("Swiss annuity institution") in 1857 as the first life insurance company in Switzerland, backed by guarantees from Schweizerische Kreditanstalt. Prominent Zurich politician Alfred Escher was closely involved in the development of the cooperative, whose goal was to provide Swiss families with insurance against the uncertainties of life: the company's board included representatives of most Swiss cantons. In 1866, Widmer obtained a license in Prussia, and a year later, the Rentenanstalt had business operations in Hamburg and Bremen. Beginning in 1894, it was one of the first insurance institutions to offer occupational insurance. Between 1866 and 1987, Rentenanstalt expanded to Germany, France, the Netherlands, Belgium, the United Kingdom, Spain, Luxembourg, and Italy. In 1988 it took over La Suisse insurance company of Lausanne.

The first registered office of Rentenanstalt was in the Tiefenhoefe buildings on the Paradeplatz in Zurich. Rapid expansion saw the offices moving in quick succession from the Gruene Schloss on Zwingliplatz, to the Chamhaus on the Untere Zäune and finally to the Alpenquai, where the new head office was opened in 1898. Although this building was spacious for its time, further expansion in the interwar period necessitated yet another move. During 1937–1939 a modern building designed by the Pfister firm of architects was constructed close to the old head office. It is this building, extended during 1961–1963 and later, that houses today's company head office in Zurich.

Going corporate
In 1997, under the management of Manfred Zobl, Rentenanstalt changed from a mutual into a publicly traded proprietary company, with Rentenstalt/Swiss Life shares debuting in the Swiss Market Index in 1998. Swiss Life then embarked on an expansionary strategy, acquiring Livit, Banca del Gottardo, the Lloyd Continental and UTO Albis in 1999, and Schweizerische Treuhandgesellschaft in 2000, and taking over the real estate properties of Oscar Weber Holding AG in 2001. In 2002, the rapid acquisitions ceased as the company looked to restructuring and going back to its core business.

Acquisitions and divestments
In 2002, the company changed its name to Swiss Life for all its operations except in the Netherlands, where it remained under the old name Zwitser Leven (Dutch for "Swiss Life"); the Netherlands company was sold in 2007 to SNS Reaal together with the Belgium business. In 2004, it sold its British operations to Resolution Life Group. In November 2007, Swiss Life sold off Banca del Gottardo for 1.775 billion CHF. On 3 December 2007, Swiss Life announced that it had launched a takeover bid for AWD Holding; on 13 March 2008, it succeeded in acquiring a total of 86.2% of AWD, which became Swiss Life Select in 2013. The acquisition of Corpus Sireo, a German real estate asset management service provider, was completed in the summer of 2014, and that of Mayfair Capital, a UK real estate investment management firm, in 2016. In 2021, Swiss Life Asset Managers acquired the real estate business of Ness, Risan & Partners, a provider of real estate projects and funds in the Nordic region.

Corporate structure

The Swiss Life Group reports by country. Besides the three core markets Switzerland, France and Germany, the Group separately discloses its cross-border segments International and Asset Managers.

Switzerland
Swiss Life Switzerland is a comprehensive life and pensions and financial service provider with the brands Swiss Life and Swiss Life Select, and is one of the leading providers with over one million insured persons.

France
Swiss Life France specialises in personal insurance but also provides, through its Swiss Life Banque Privée subsidiary, asset management and insurance services combined with private banking for high net worth individuals.

Germany
The German branch of Swiss Life, founded in 1866, is based in Munich and offers private and corporate clients services in pensions saving and financial security. Core competencies are occupational disability insurance and occupational pensions. Swiss Life's financial distribution subsidiaries (Swiss Life Select, HORBACH, Tecis and Proventus) are headquartered in Hanover.

International
With locations in Switzerland, Luxembourg, Liechtenstein and Singapore, Swiss Life International offers Private placement life insurance (a form of investment with an insurance wrapper) for high-net-worth individuals in Europe and Asia, and provides employee benefits for large corporate clients. The financial advisors from Swiss Life Select Austria, Czech Republic, Slovakia, Poland and Chase de Vere in the UK also operate under the Swiss Life International umbrella.

Asset Managers
Swiss Life Asset Managers offers institutional and private investors access to investment and asset management services. In Switzerland, it is one of the largest institutional asset managers and the third largest fund provider in the country. In Germany, Swiss Life Asset Managers significantly strengthened its position in the market with the acquisition of the real estate asset management service provider Corpus Sireo in 2014. The real estate management company Livit AG is also a subsidiary of the Swiss Life Asset Management entity, along with London-based Mayfair Capital Investment which was acquired in 2016. In 2018, Swiss Life Asset Managers acquired the German real estate company BEOS AG and in 2019 Fontavis, an investment manager for clean energy and infrastructure funds.

Corporate governance

Board of directors
The board of directors is responsible for the general direction of the Group and the supervision of the Corporate Executive Board. The Board is elected for one-year terms and is composed as follows:

Corporate executive board
The group CEO directs the business operations of the group and works out the long-term objectives and strategic orientation of the group, together with the corporate executive board.

 Group CEO:  Patrick Frost
 Group CFO:  Matthias Aellig
 Group CIO: Stefan Mächler 
 CEO Switzerland: Markus Leibundgut
 CEO France: Tanguy Polet
 CEO Germany: Jörg Arnold
 CEO International: Nils Frowein

Financials
According to Swiss law, shareholders are obliged to disclose information regarding their shareholdings in Swiss-based companies when these amount to or exceed 3%. Shareholders currently holding registered shares (purchasing positions included) of Swiss Life Holding Ltd., are BlackRock Inc. (over 5%), and UBS Fund Management (Switzerland) AG (over 3%).

CSR and sponsorship
The “Perspectives Foundation” of Swiss Life, established in 2005, promotes charitable initiatives in the Swiss home market in the areas of health, science, education, culture and sport, donating between CHF 1.3 and 1.5 million every year to social and charitable projects.

Swiss Life also jointly founded the Swiss Climate Foundation with eleven other companies in 2008. All partners donate their net gains from redistributed  levies to the foundation, which in turns supports projects helping small and medium-sized enterprises to reach voluntary target agreement with the Energy Agency of the Swiss Private Sector (EnAW), develop operational energy savings and climate protection systems.

In March 2016, the Swiss Life Group presented its first Corporate Responsibility Report in accordance with the guidelines of the Global Reporting Initiative (GRI), as an integral part of the Annual Report 2015. The Corporate Responsibility Report focuses on business activities, society, employees and the environment and is guided by the principle of materiality. The report is published annually.

From 2004 to 2020, Swiss Life sponsored the Swiss national football team.

In the field of culture, Swiss Life supports, among others, the Zurich Film Festival (ZFF), the Lucerne Festival, the Zurich Opera House, the Tonhalle Orchestra Zurich and the Davos Festival.

Since the 2015/16 season, Swiss Life has been supporting the ice hockey club ZSC Lions as general sponsor. Swiss Life Arena, the hockey and sports arena for 12,000 fans of the ZCS Lions club in Altstetten, is also named after Swiss Life. The opening took place in October 2022.

See also

Swiss Insurance Association
Swiss Life Select

References

Financial services companies established in 1857
Insurance companies of Switzerland
Swiss Life (demutualized 1997)
Life insurance companies
Swiss brands
Companies listed on the SIX Swiss Exchange
Swiss Life